The Theophilus Allen House is a historic house in Palo Alto, California, U.S.. It was built in 1905 for Theophilus Allen, the founder of the Palo Alto Christian Science Church. It was designed in the American Craftsman style by architect Alfred W. Smith. It has been listed on the National Register of Historic Places since May 20, 1999.

References

Houses on the National Register of Historic Places in California
Houses completed in 1905
American Craftsman architecture in California
Houses in Palo Alto, California
1905 establishments in California